John Delanty (born 8 November 1938) is a former  Australian rules footballer who played with St Kilda in the Victorian Football League (VFL).

Notes

External links 

Living people
1938 births
Australian rules footballers from Tasmania
St Kilda Football Club players
Launceston Football Club players